Roseovarius nubinhibens is a species of Gram-negative, rod-shaped, aerobic dimethylsulfoniopropionate-demethylating bacteria. Its type strain is ISMT (=ATCC BAA-591T =DSM 15170T).

References

Further reading

External links
LPSN
Type strain of Roseovarius nubinhibens at BacDive -  the Bacterial Diversity Metadatabase

Rhodobacteraceae
Bacteria described in 2003